"All Around the World" is a song by the English rock band Oasis. It was written by the band's lead guitarist and principal songwriter Noel Gallagher. Released on 12 January 1998 as the third single from their third studio album Be Here Now (1997), it is the longest song ever recorded by Oasis. The song peaked at number one on the UK Singles Chart, becoming the longest song ever to reach number one, and earned a Gold certification. This was the last Oasis single to be released on the Creation Records label. The song also reached number one in Ireland and peaked at number 15 on the US Billboard Modern Rock Tracks chart.

Nearly ten minutes long, the song is embellished with string and horn pieces, and is followed by the two-minute-long instrumental "All Around the World (Reprise)". Upon its release, the reviews were generally positive. As with many Oasis songs (such as "Whatever", "Acquiesce", "Live Forever") it sends the message that "everything's gonna be okay". This was their last UK single to feature rhythm guitarist Paul "Bonehead" Arthurs and bassist Paul McGuigan before they left the band in 1999.

History
The song was one of the first to be written by Noel, and there are recorded sessions of the band rehearsing it at the Boardwalk club as early as 1992. However, despite Noel's fondness for the song, it did not appear on their first two albums—Definitely Maybe and (What's the Story) Morning Glory?—as he wanted to wait until the band could afford to produce the song in the extravagant manner in which it eventually appeared. Gallagher has claimed that this is one of the best songs he has ever written.

The final production sound for the song was envisaged as early as spring 1994. In the interview "Wibbling Rivalry," Noel Gallagher said of the song, "With Supersonic, I worried I was never going to write another song after that 'cos I thought, 'It sounds that good'... Two days later I superseded it by about 50 fuckin' times. The reason we haven't recorded that song is because there isn't enough money in Creation Records' bank balance to pay for the production of that record." Noel also added when asked if there would be an orchestra on it, "Orchestras, man? It's not got to be one, it's got to be two".

The final version premiered on 11 August 1997 on BBC Radio 1's The Evening Session hosted by Steve Lamacq, ten days before the release of the album, alongside the album tracks "The Girl in the Dirty Shirt" and "Be Here Now".

Noel described the song shortly before the release of the album: "I wrote this one ages ago, before 'Whatever'. It was twelve minutes long then. It was a matter of being able to afford to record it. But now we can get away with the 36-piece orchestra. And the longer the better as far as I'm concerned. If it's good. I can see what people are going to say, but fuck 'em, basically."

"The lyrics are teeny-poppy. But there are three key changes towards the end. Imagine how much better Hey Jude would have been with three key changes towards the end. I like the ambition of it, all that time ago. What was all that about when we didn't even have our first single out? Gin and tonics, eh?"

The harmonica pieces on the track were performed by Mark Feltham. Backing vocals were provided by Noel and Liam's then-wives, Meg Mathews and Patsy Kensit, along with Richard Ashcroft of The Verve.

When it was suggested that Oasis take legal action against pop band Hear'Say for their first single's ("Pure and Simple") similarity to "All Around the World", Noel simply laughed at the hypocrisy of such an act from a man who was famous for "borrowing" from other artists. Portions of the song's chorus were used as background music for AT&T's advertising campaign for "The New AT&T".

Reprise
A two-minute, ten-second instrumental reprise of the song closes the Be Here Now album.

Music video
Keeping with the feel of the song, the music video was also a lavish affair. Featuring the band in a yellow spaceship, the animated piece saw them travel through a world akin to The Beatles' Yellow Submarine film. The video was directed by Jonathan Dayton and Valerie Faris and took 24 computer animators and 6 months to make.

Track listings

UK 7-inch and cassette single (CRE 282; CRECS 282)
 "All Around the World" (7-inch edit)
 "The Fame"

UK and Australian CD single (CRESCD 282; 665362 2)
 "All Around the World"
 "The Fame"
 "Flashbax"
 "Street Fighting Man" 

UK 12-inch single (CRE 282T)
 "All Around the World"
 "The Fame"
 "Flashbax"

US promo CD (ESK 3619)
 "All Around the World" (radio edit)
 "All Around the World" (video edit)
 "All Around the World" (LP version)

Personnel
Oasis
Liam Gallagher – lead vocals, tambourine
Noel Gallagher – lead and acoustic guitars, backing vocals
Paul Arthurs – rhythm guitar
Paul McGuigan – bass
Alan White – drums

Additional musicians
Mike Rowe – piano
Mark Feltham – harmonica
Richard Ashcroft – backing vocals
Nick Ingman – string and brass arrangements

Charts and certifications

Weekly charts

Year-end charts

Certifications

References

1990s ballads
1997 songs
1998 singles
Creation Records singles
Epic Records singles
Irish Singles Chart number-one singles
Music videos directed by Jonathan Dayton and Valerie Faris
Number-one singles in Scotland
Oasis (band) songs
Rock ballads
Song recordings produced by Noel Gallagher
Songs written by Noel Gallagher
Symphonic rock songs
UK Independent Singles Chart number-one singles
UK Singles Chart number-one singles